Coking is the heating of coal in the absence of oxygen to a temperature above 600 °C to drive off the volatile components of the raw coal, leaving a hard, strong, porous material of high carbon content called coke. Coke consists almost entirely of hydrocarbons. The porosity gives it a high surface area, which makes it burn faster (as does a sheet of paper versus a wooden log). When a kilogram of coke is burned it releases more heat than a kilogram of the original coal.

Coke is used as fuel in a blast furnace. In a continuous process, coke, iron ore, and limestone are mixed together and placed in the top of the blast furnace, and at the bottom liquid iron and waste slag are removed. The raw materials continuously move down the blast furnace. During this continuous process more raw materials are placed at the top, and as the coke moves down, it must withstand the ever-increasing weight of the materials above it. It is the ability to withstand this crushing force, in addition to its high energy content and rapid combustion, that makes coke ideal for use in blast furnaces.

Petroleum coking
“Coking is a refinery unit operation that upgrades material called bottoms from the atmospheric or vacuum distillation column into higher-value products and produces petroleum coke—a coal-like material.”. In heterogeneous catalysis, the process is undesirable because the clinker blocks the catalytic sites. Coking is characteristic of high temperature reactions involving hydrocarbon feedstocks. Typically coking is reversed by combustion, provided that the catalyst will tolerate such.

A simplified equation for coking is shown in the case of ethylene:
 3 C2H4  →   2 C ("coke") +  2 C2H6
A more realistic but complex view involves the alkylation of an aromatic ring of a coke nucleus. Acidic catalysts are thus especially prone to coking because they are effective at generating carbocations (i.e., alkylating agents).

Coking is one of several mechanisms for the deactivation of a heterogeneous catalyst. Other mechanisms include sintering, poisoning, and solid-state transformation of the catalyst.

See also 

 Gas to liquids

References

Coking works
Catalysis